Lemnia is a genus of beetles belonging to the family Coccinellidae.

The species of this genus are found in Eastern Asia.

Species:

Lemnia circumsta 
Lemnia circumvelata 
Lemnia duvauceli 
Lemnia saucia

References

Coccinellidae